This is a list of sports stadiums in England, ranked in descending order of capacity. All stadiums in England with a capacity of 10,000 or more are included.

Only stadiums within the territory of England are included; thus the home stadiums of the six Welsh football clubs playing in the English football league system are not listed here.

Current stadiums

Former stadiums

Following crowd troubles in the 1980s, and regulations imposed after the Taylor Report, several English football league stadiums have been built or completely redeveloped in the last few years. Prior to 1988, however, the last newly built Football League ground in England & Wales was Roots Hall, Southend, which was opened in 1955.Next was in 1989.

Future stadiums
Stadiums which are currently in development, and are likely to open in the near future, include:

See also
 List of stadiums in the United Kingdom by capacity
 List of football stadiums in England
 List of cricket grounds in England and Wales
 List of English rugby league stadiums by capacity
 Ground developments to football stadiums in the English football league system
 List of European stadiums by capacity

References

External links
The Internet Football Ground Guide
Map of Top Tier English Football Stadiums
Atlas of worldwide football stadiums for GoogleEarth
List of Stadiums Pictures in England

 
England
Stadiums, Football
Lists of sports venues in the United Kingdom
England